Samuel Hale may refer to:

 Samuel W. Hale (1823–1891), American manufacturer and politician in New Hampshire
 Samuel Hale, Jr. (1800–1877), American merchant, judge and politician in Wisconsin